Eaves is an English surname. Notable people with the name include: 

 Allen C Eaves (born 1941), Canadian medical researcher
 Ben Eaves (born 1982), American ice hockey player
 Ben Eaves (basketball) (born 1987), British basketball player
 Benjamin Franklin Eaves (1870–1953), American horse and buggy doctor
 Charles Eaves (1908–2006), Canadian scientist
 Connie Eaves (born 1944), Canadian medical researcher
 Dan Eaves (born 1975), British auto racing driver
 Dashiell Eaves (born 1974), American actor
 Elisabeth Eaves Canadian author and journalist
 Elsie Eaves (1898–1983), first female associate member of the American Society of Civil Engineers
 Gerald R. Eaves (born 1939), California State Assemblyman
 Hubert Eaves III, American keyboardist, songwriter and record producer
 Ian Eaves, British researcher and consultant on arms and armour
 Jerry Eaves (born 1959), American college basketball coach
 Joel Eaves (1914–1991), American college football and basketball player and coach
 John Eaves (born 1962) designer and illustrator
 John Arthur Eaves Jr. (born 1966), American attorney and politician
 Laurence Eaves (born 1948), British physicist and professor
 Les Eaves (born 1967), American businessman and politician from Arkansas
 Lindon Eaves (born 1944), behavior geneticist
 Mark Eaves (born 1961), Australian rules footballer
 Max Eaves (born 1988), English pole vaulter
 Mike Eaves (born 1956), Canadian-American ice hockey player and coach
 Murray Eaves (born 1960), Canadian ice hockey player
 Patrick Eaves (born 1984), Canadian-American ice hockey forward
 Simon Eaves (born 1986), British, artist and musician
 Steve Eaves (born 1952), Welsh poet, songwriter and singer
 Tom Eaves (born 1992), English footballer
 Vallie Eaves (1911–1960), American baseball pitcher
 Wilberforce Eaves (1867–1920), British tennis player

See also
 Eaves (disambiguation)
 Eves, surname
 Gary Eave, baseball player